The 2007 BWF Season was the overall badminton circuit organized by the Badminton World Federation (BWF) for the 2007 badminton season to publish and promote the sport. Besides the BWF World Championships, BWF promotes the sport of Badminton through an extensive worldwide program of events. These events have various purposes according to their level and territory in which they are held but those events owned by BWF seek to showcase the Sport via the widest possible quality television broadcast and build the fanbase of the Sport throughout the World.

The world badminton tournament structure has four levels: Level 1 (BWF Major Events: Thomas Cup, Uber Cup, Sudirman Cup, Suhadinata Cup, World Championships, Bimantara Cup, and World Senior Championships), Level 2 (BWF Superseries: Superseries and Superseries Masters Finals), Level 3 (BWF Grand Prix: Grand Prix and Grand Prix Gold), and Level 4 (BWF Continental Tournament: International Challenge, International Series, and Future Series). The Thomas Cup & Uber Cup, Sudirman Cup and Suhandinata Cup are Teams Events. The others – Superseries, Grand Prix Events, International Challenge, International Series, Future Series and Bimantara Cup are all individual tournaments. The higher the level of tournament, the larger the prize money and the more ranking points available.

The 2007 BWF Season calendar comprised the World Championships tournaments, the Sudirman Cup, the BWF Super Series, the Grand Prix (Grand Prix Gold and Grand Prix), the International Series (International Series and International Challenge), and Future Series.

Schedule
This is the complete schedule of events on the 2007 calendar, with the Champions and Runners-up documented.
Key

January

February

March

April

May

June

July

August

September

October

November

December

References

External links
Badminton World Federation (BWF)

BWF season
2007